Turn Up the Music may refer to:

"Turn Up the Music" (Bridgit Mendler song), a 2011 song by Bridgit Mendler
"Turn Up the Music" (Chris Brown song), a 2012 single by Chris Brown
Turn Up the Music!, a 1993 compilation album by Sammy Hagar
"How You Live (Turn Up the Music)", a 2007 single by Point of Grace
Turn Up the Music: The Hits of Point of Grace, a 2011 greatest hits album by Point of Grace